On the Waves of Happiness (Romanian: Pe valurile fericirii) is a 1920 Romanian silent film directed by Dolly A. Szigethy and starring Lya De Putti, Maria Filotti, and Ian Manolescu.

Cast
 Lya De Putti
 Maria Filotti 
 Ian Manolescu 
 Gheorghe Storin 
 Tantzi Cutava-Barozzi
 Alexandre Mihalesco 
 Petre Bulandra 
 Gina Petrescu 
 Mimi Bulandra

References

Bibliography
 Bock, Hans-Michael & Bergfelder, Tim. The Concise CineGraph. Encyclopedia of German Cinema. Berghahn Books, 2009.

External links

1920 films
Romanian-language films
Romanian silent films
Romanian black-and-white films